Francis Bennon Ducrue was a missionary in Mexico, b. in Munich, Bavaria, of French parents, 10 June 1721; d. there 30 March 1779. He became a member of the Society of Jesus in 1738, and ten years later was sent to California, where he worked until the expulsion of the order in 1767. At the time, Ducrue was the superior of all the California missions. He submitted to the decree of expulsion and cooperated with the royal commission in enforcing its provisions. The Jesuits withdrew, taking with them only their clothes and a few books; these were the belongings they carried away from California after seventy years of work in its missions.

Ducrue eventually returned to his native land. He wrote A Journey from California through the district of Mexico to Europe in the year 1767 in Latin. The book was translated into German for the Nachrichten von verschiedenen Ländern des spanischen Amerika of Christoph Gottlieb von Murr (vol. XII, p. 217-276), and was translated into French and published by Fr. Carayon in his Documents Inédits (Paris, 1876). Murr also gives some interesting specimens of the language of California, which were communicated to him by Ducrue.

References

Attribution

1721 births
1779 deaths
18th-century German Jesuits
German Roman Catholic missionaries
German male writers
Jesuit missionaries
Jesuit missionaries in New Spain
German people of French descent